The Bombenzielanlage ("Bomb Target System"), sometimes referred to as the Bomb Ziel Automat (BZA), was a German World War II bombsight analog computer designed to calculate the precise release of bombs during dive-bombing. It was fitted to a number of aircraft types, including the Junkers Ju 88 and the Arado Ar 234. The unit controlled an aiming mark on sight in front of the pilot. The computer assessed the angle of dive, aircraft track, and altitude. The operator set other variables, such as barometric pressure, target altitude, airspeed and wind speed. During operation, the bomb(s) were released when an aiming mark coincided with the target.

Further reading
 Photographs of BZA equipment: Images 18 to 23 in image gallery in Hollway, Don, 'The Battle of Graveney Marsh'. History Magazine. Feb/March 2019. http://www.donhollway.com/graveneymarsh/index.html Accessed 2020-04-20.

References

German bomber aircraft
Optical bombsights
World War II military equipment of Germany
Analog computers